Sam's Town Hotel and Gambling Hall, commonly shortened to Sam's Town, is a casino brand owned by Boyd Gaming, named after its founder, Sam Boyd (1910–1993). Five properties have carried the Sam's Town name; three remain owned and operated by Boyd Gaming.

History
The first Sam's Town opened in the Las Vegas Valley in Sunrise Manor, Nevada, on April 1, 1979. Branded as Sam's Town Hotel and Gambling Hall, Las Vegas, it has undergone several expansions, including an 18-screen theatre added in 2000. , the facility includes 645 hotel rooms.

The second Sam's Town opened in 1984 in Laughlin, Nevada. Originally branded as Sam's Town Gold River, it was later shortened to Gold River and was operated by Boyd Gaming until March 1991.

The third Sam's Town opened in 1994 in Tunica Resorts, Mississippi. It was expanded after Boyd Gaming bought an adjacent property in 2002. Branded as Sam's Town Hotel and Gambling Hall, Tunica,  it has over 700 hotel rooms.

The fourth Sam's Town was a riverboat casino that operated in Kansas City, Missouri, from September 1995 until July 1998. It was branded as Sam's Town Gambling Hall, Kansas City.

The fifth Sam's Town opened in May 2004 after Boyd Gaming acquired an existing property in Shreveport, Louisiana, from Harrah's Entertainment. Branded as Sam's Town Hotel and Gambling Hall, Shreveport,  it has over 500 hotel rooms.

Sponsorship

Boyd Gaming has sponsored several NASCAR races with Sam's Town branding. In the NASCAR Craftsman Truck Series, the Sam's Town 250 was held at Las Vegas Motor Speedway in 1998, and the Sam's Town 400 was held at Texas Motor Speedway from 2006 to 2008. In the NASCAR Busch Series, the Sam's Town 300 was held at Las Vegas Motor Speedway from 1998 to 2013, and the Sam's Town 250 was held at Memphis International Raceway from 1999 to 2007.

In ten-pin bowling, the Sam's Town Invitational was an event on the Ladies Pro Bowlers Tour (now the Professional Women's Bowling Association) from 1979 into the 1990s.

In the mid-1990s, a Boeing 737-300 operated by Western Pacific Airlines, tail number N955WP, was painted in the Sam's Town color scheme, also listing its casino locations (Las Vegas, Kansas City, Tunica).

References

External links
 

Boyd Gaming